Michal Kovařčík (born November 19, 1996) is a Czech professional ice hockey player. As of 2023, he is playing for Mikkelin Jukurit of the Finnish Liiga.

Kovařčík made his Czech Extraliga debut playing with HC Oceláři Třinec during the 2015–16 season.

His elder brother Ondřej is also a professional hockey player – only 18 months apart in age, their early careers followed almost the same trajectory; their success as a partnership led to their being nicknamed after the Sedin twins. Former NHL winger Tomáš Fleischmann is their stepbrother.

References

External links

1996 births
Living people
HC Oceláři Třinec players
HC Frýdek-Místek players
Czech ice hockey forwards
Sportspeople from Nový Jičín
Mikkelin Jukurit players
Czech expatriate ice hockey players in Finland